Fjellner is a Swedish surname. Notable people with the surname include: 

Anders Fjellner (1795–1876), Sámi priest and poet
Christofer Fjellner (born 1976), Swedish politician

See also
Fellner

Swedish-language surnames